Phallus glutinolens is a species of fungus in the stinkhorn family. Found in Brazil, it was described as new to science in 1895 by Friedrich Alfred Gustav Jobst Möller  as Ithyphallus glutinolens, and later transferred to the genus Phallus in 1898. The species was emended in 2009.

References

External links

Fungi described in 1895
Fungi of South America
Phallales